Joel Greenblatt (born December 13, 1957) is an American academic, hedge fund manager, investor, and writer. He is a value investor, alumnus of the Wharton School of the University of Pennsylvania, and adjunct professor at the Columbia University Graduate School of Business. He runs Gotham Asset Management with his partner, Robert Goldstein. He is the former chairman of the board of Alliant Techsystems (1994–1995) and founder of the New York Securities Auction Corporation. He was a director at Pzena Investment Management, a firm specializing in value investing and asset management for high-net worth clients.

Early life and education
Greenblatt was born in Great Neck, New York. Greenblatt is a graduate of The Wharton School at the University of Pennsylvania, receiving his B.S. summa cum laude in 1979 and M.B.A. in 1980. At Wharton, his paper "How the small investor can beat the market" was published in The Journal of Portfolio Management. Greenblatt spent one year studying law at Stanford Law School in California before dropping out to pursue a career in finance.

Career in finance

From Gotham Capital To Gotham Asset Management 
In 1985, Greenblatt started a hedge fund, Gotham Capital, with $7 million, most of which was provided by "junk-bond king" Michael Milken. Robert Goldstein joined Gotham Capital in 1989. At Gotham Capital between 1985 and 1994, Greenblatt presided over an annualized return of 50% "after all expenses" but "before general partner's incentive allocation" fees; or 30%, net of all fees.) Gotham specialized in "special situations" like spinoffs and other corporate restructurings". In January 1995 Gotham returned all capital of outside partners (approximately $500 million).

From 1995 to 2009 Gotham Capital was closed to outside investors.

In 2000 Gotham Capital helped Michael Burry create his hedge fund Scion Capital by buying 25% of its capital for one million dollars after taxes. In October 2006, Gotham's investment in the funds managed by Scion amounted to $100 million. Gotham exited its investments both in the managed funds by Scion Capital and as a shareholder. 

In 2008 Gotham Asset Management, LLC was created as "the successor to the investment advisory business of Gotham Capital". In 2010, Gotham started four conventional mutual funds raising $360 million. As of December 2021 Gotham Asset Management, LLC managed $3.74 billion.

Value Investing Professor 
Greenblatt served as an adjunt professor teaching value investing classes for MBA students at Columbia University's Graduate School of Business for over 20 years.

Value Investors Club
Greenblatt co-founded a website with John Petry called the Value Investors Club, where investors approved through an application process exchange value and special situation investment ideas. Membership is capped at 250 members and is considered highly prestigious. A 2012 academic study showed that the recommendations of the members of the club do in fact appear to generate significant abnormal profits. The club awards $5000 bimonthly to members who provide the best advice.

Magic Formula Investing
Greenblatt's book The Little Book that Beats the Market (Wiley, 2005 & 2010) introduced the investment strategy of "magic formula investing", a method for determining which stocks to buy: "cheap and good companies" with a high earnings yield and a high return on invested capital. His strategy is featured in The Guru Investor by John P. Reese. Several studies from around the world have found Greenblat's formula tends to result in long-term outperformance relative to market averages, but is also associated with significantly higher short-term volatility and sharper drawdowns due to his concentrated approach of 20–30 stocks.

Philanthropy 
In 2006, Greenblatt co-founded the Success Academy Charter Schools, then known as the Harlem Success Academy Charter School, an elementary school in the city's historically African-American neighborhood.

During 2007 and 2008, Joel Greenblatt, Robert Goldstein and Gary Curhan created a website, inspired by the Value Investors Club, to spur idea sharing in order to advance cancer research. The $1 million Gotham Prize for Cancer Research was awarded in 2008 to Alexander Varshavsky for trying to find a potentially vulnerable feature of cancer cells that won't change during tumor progression.

Greenblatt is a founding Master Player of the Portfolios with Purpose virtual stock trading contest.

Bibliography

 Updated 2010 version : The Little Book that Still Beats the Market. .

References

External links

1957 births
Living people
American chief executives of financial services companies
American finance and investment writers
American financiers
American hedge fund managers
American investors
American money managers
Philanthropists from New York (state)
American stock traders
Businesspeople from New York (state)
Columbia University faculty
Drexel Burnham Lambert
People from Great Neck, New York
Wharton School of the University of Pennsylvania alumni
Writers from New York (state)